Mackenzie High School was a public high school in Detroit, Michigan.

History

Located on Detroit's west side, Mackenzie High School was named to honor David D. Mackenzie, who had served as principal of Central High School, and as first dean of the city college that would become Wayne State University.

Mackenzie High School was among the first schools constructed on land acquired through Detroit's westernmost annexation efforts in Greenfield Township; by 1926 the township had ceased to exist. Adorned in blue and yellow tile from the Pewabic Pottery Works, the three-story facility opened in September 1928. In an effort to make efficient use of available classrooms, the school's early history featured a full range of grade levels – elementary through secondary.

In June of 2012, the school was demolished, and replaced with a K-8 elementary-middle school, which kept the name of Mackenzie.

Athletics
The Mackenzie Stags were the 1979 boys state basketball champion. Girls track and  field won the state championship in 1978.

Notable alumni 

 Jerome Bettis  Hall of Fame NFL  running back
 Kevin Brooks  NFL defensive end
 Gilbert Brown  NFL defensive tackle 
 Richard Byas Jr.  NFL defensive back
 Dennis Coffey  musician 
 Kenny Garrett  jazz musician
 Barbara Gilders-Dudeck  Olympic diver
 Paula Gosling  crime novelist
 Saul Green  US Attorney for Eastern District of Michigan 
 Pepper Johnson  NFL linebacker 
 Marilyn Jean Kelly  Chief Justice of the Michigan Supreme Court
 Ray Lane  radio-TV sports personality
 Jeff Mills  musician 
 Stanley Mouse  artist
 Nick Perry  NFL linebacker
 Sidney Ribeau  college academic administrator
 Roz Ryan  actress 
 Tom Skerritt  actor
 Doug Smith  National Basketball Association (NBA) power forward
 Tony Tashnick  NCAA swimmer
 Delisa Walton-Floyd  Olympic middle distance runner 
 Gary Waters  NCAA men's basketball head coach

See also
 12th Street Riot

References

External links

 Inside the abandoned Mackenzie High School

Former high schools in Michigan
Educational institutions established in 1928
High schools in Detroit
Educational institutions disestablished in 2007
Demolished buildings and structures in Detroit
1928 establishments in Michigan
Buildings and structures demolished in 2012
 
Detroit Public Schools Community District
School buildings completed in 1928
2007 disestablishments in Michigan